The city of Seattle experienced protests over the murder of George Floyd in 2020 and 2021. Beginning on May 29, 2020, demonstrators took to the streets throughout the city for marches and sit-ins, often of a peaceful nature but which also devolved into riots.  Participants expressed opposition to systemic racism, police brutality and violence against people of color.

By June 8, there had been eleven straight days with major protests in Seattle. The Capitol Hill neighborhood experienced a week-long series of clashes between demonstrators and police near the East Precinct that culminated in the formation of the Capitol Hill Organized Protest (CHOP) area, after police abandoned the precinct on June 8.  The month of June brought further protests including a Black Lives Matter general strike and silent protest march with 60,000 people on June 12 and several actions throughout the city for Juneteenth. The CHOP zone was reclaimed by police on July 1 after two fatal shootings. It was followed by a fatal vehicle collision with protesters on Interstate 5 over the July 4 holiday.

Major protests reemerged in opposition to the deployment of federal law enforcement in the city by the Trump administration. Additional actions occurred on July 19, July 22, and again on July 25, when several businesses were vandalized and five construction trailers were set on fire at a youth jail.

Events 
On May 29, demonstrators gathered in the evening near Hing Hay Park in Seattle’s Chinatown district to protest the murder of George Floyd. Protestors later marched downtown and clashed with police, with police firing teargas and arresting several protesters. 

In the evening, windows were broken on storefronts near Fifth Avenue South and South Jackson Street. Damaged businesses included a Bank of America branch, a dim sum restaurant, and an insurance office.

May 30 riots 

A larger demonstration was organized and held on May 30 at Westlake Park, joined by thousands from a protest at police headquarters, and evolved into a standoff between protesters and police, leading to acts of looting and arson in Seattle, among them the Nordstrom flagship store. Protesters also blocked Interstate 5 in both directions.

Protesters removed two AR-15 rifles from an abandoned police cruiser. Q13 Fox News correspondent Brandi Kruse reported that a rioter was firing one of the weapons into vehicles. A security guard hired by the news crew drew his pistol on the protesters and seized the weapons. Seattle Police Department reported that two rifles were returned without having been fired; KIRO TV and other media reported that at least one of the rifles was fired during the riot while out of police control. A KIRO reporter reported hearing "explosions" during the afternoon of May 30. Sometime in the afternoon a child was maced by a police officer. The incident was reported as under review by the Seattle Office of Police Accountability on June 2, though as of July 18 the officer involved had not been disciplined or officially identified. A week later Seattle police arrested Evan Hreha, a hot dog stand operator who recorded a video of the child who had been sprayed, on suspicion of unlawfully discharging a laser. He was later released without charge.

On this day, while Seattle police were attempting to detain looters, a white suspect was restrained with an officer's knee on his neck for 13 seconds while bystanders urged the officer to stop. This continued until a second officer intervened to push the first officer's knee to the suspect's back. This was documented on video. George Floyd himself had died after being restrained with a knee on his neck during an arrest. According to The Huffington Post, further video footage showed that the same Seattle officer had just used his knee on the neck of another white looting suspect.

In response to the unrest, Seattle Mayor Jenny Durkan declared a 5:00 pm curfew on May 30 and May 31. While conceding that the local protests were largely peaceful, she stated that the curfew was in response to the instances of violence and was "intended to preserve the health and safety of our residents by keeping our streets safe and accessible for essential workers and first responders and preventing the further spread of COVID-19."

Protests continued on May 31. A cleanup effort was organized to support businesses in Downtown and the International District.

Capitol Hill clashes 
On June 1, police and protesters clashed in Cal Anderson Park on Capitol Hill after hours of demonstrations and a march to the Seattle PD East Precinct.

Protesters on Capitol Hill began using umbrellas to shield themselves from tear gas, adopting a tactic used during Hong Kong's Umbrella Revolution. A pink umbrella used by a protester was taken by police, causing more umbrellas to appear the following day and pink umbrellas specifically to become a symbol of the Seattle protests. Frontline footage of this event was captured by Omari Salisbury of Converge Media, which clearly shows the sequence of actions on both the police and protester sides that led to the escalation.

On June 2, a protest led by activists Rashyla Levitt and David Lewis marched from Westlake Park to Seattle City Hall with the intention of forcing Durkan to exit the building and talk to the activists. After an hour and a half Durkan spoke to the protesters and agreed to meet with leaders of the movement the next day. This was the first time Durkan had spoken to protesters after five days of demonstrations. Many protesters were unfamiliar with Levitt and Lewis; Black Lives Matter released a statement that they had no affiliation with the pair. Suspicions over Levitt and Lewis were first reported by Seattle journalist Erica C. Barnett and quickly escalated to accusations of Lewis and Levitt being either police "plants" working against the movement, or simply naive novices who were "in over their head." Both Levitt and Lewis denied being police collaborators and no evidence proving their guilt has been provided. Levitt stated that she did not initially intend to be a leader and it happened organically; she had been receiving death threats since the rumors began. After the June 3 meeting with leaders of the protests that Levitt and Lewis initiated, Durkan ended the citywide curfew and announced the city's withdrawal from ending the consent decree on the SPD. On June 29 Levitt had a physical altercation with Fox News reporter Dan Springer and was arrested on July 1 during the police clearance of the Capitol Hill Occupied Protest. Community activist Andrè Taylor referred to Lewis and Levitt as "youngsters" and chastised Lewis when demonstrators refused to comply with his demand that they evacuate CHOP.

On June 5, Mayor Durkan announced a 30-day ban on police use of tear gas, saying officers "do not need to be using tear gas at protests as a crowd management tool."

In light of the 30 day ban on tear gas, on June 6 Seattle police used pepper spray and blast balls to disperse protesters outside the East Precinct on Capitol Hill. City Council President Lorena González criticized the police response, tweeting "This is NOT what de-escalation looks like!" Also on June 6, the Seattle Police Department posted photographs of a candle on Twitter which it described as an "improvised explosive" and an "incendiary device" that had been thrown at officers.

On June 7, during a demonstration at the East Precinct on Capitol Hill, a man, later identified as Nikolas Fernandez, drove a black Honda Civic into the crowd. As the vehicle was in motion, protester Daniel Gregory reached in the driver's side window. Fernandez then shot Gregory in the arm, exited the vehicle and ran past the barricades to the police line. Fernandez, whose brother works at the East Precinct, shot Gregory with a Glock 26 that had extended magazines taped together jungle style.

Later that evening (on June 7), police "unleashed a barrage of tear gas and flash bangs" on a crowd outside the East Precinct on Capitol Hill despite the 30 day ban on tear gas. Aubreanna Inda, a 26-year-old protester, experienced cardiac arrest after being shot repeatedly with flash grenades by police while kneeling. Police Chief Carmen Best defended the use of tear gas, saying that the 30 day ban exempts SWAT officers and “life safety issues.” City Councilwoman Kshama Sawant was among the victims and claimed that there was no provocation from protesters before tear gas was deployed. The following day, Kshama Sawant alongside fellow Councilwomen Teresa Mosqueda and Tammy Morales, called upon Mayor Jenny Durkan to resign over the way the city has handled the protests. Police use of flash grenades and tear gas continued and grew in intensity over the subsequent days.

Police retreat from the East Precinct 

Early in the afternoon on June 8, police began removing all items of value from the East Precinct on Capitol Hill, preparing for the possibility that the East Precinct may need to be abandoned, as happened on May 28 in Minneapolis. The streets surrounding the precinct were reopened and protesters marched up to the precinct that evening. After police withdrew from the East Precinct of Seattle, six blocks adjacent to it were walled off by protesters with barricades to prevent another vehicle attack. The six blocks around the East Precinct were declared by protesters to be the Capitol Hill Occupied Protest.

On June 9, hundreds of protesters temporarily occupied City Hall calling for the resignation of Mayor Jenny Durkan.

An exposé by The Seattle Times on June 12 found that Fox News had digitally altered photographs of the Capitol Hill Occupied Protest to include a man armed with an assault rifle. The Fox News website also used a photograph of a burning scene from the Minnesota protests to illustrate their articles on Seattle's protests.

June 12 general strike 
After meeting with Mayor Jenny Durkan on June 6, Black Lives Matter Seattle-King County called for a statewide general strike and silent protest march on June 12. The demands of the protest would be for police to keep their body cams on during protests and stop the sweeps of homeless camps, and for the City of Seattle to divest $100 million of the police budget used for militarization of police and invest the money into social services, to drop their lawsuit against King County over the inquest process, to require that "'Community Oversight' be a part of the police contract bargaining process," and to develop and fund a Black Commission to address racial issues going forward.

In the days leading up to the protest, occupiers of the Capitol Hill Occupied Protest painted a giant colorful mural spelling out "Black Lives Matter" on East Pine Street.

Many Seattle businesses closed for the day or closed early because of the general strike and to allow their employees to leave work and attend the protest. Black Lives Matter Seattle/King County claimed that about 60,000 people joined the silent protest march on June 12.

Juneteenth demonstrations 

Hundreds gathered on June 18, the eve of Juneteenth, for a vigil in Magnuson Park in remembrance of Charleena Lyles, a pregnant mother of four who was shot and killed at home in her apartment by Seattle police exactly three years prior in 2017.

Local activist Andre Taylor, whose brother was killed by Seattle police in 2016, held a rally on June 19 in Judkins Park which was attended by Mayor Durkan and King County Executive Dow Constantine.

Thousands of people marched through the historically black Central District to Jimi Hendrix Park chanting "black lives matter." The march was organized by the King County Equity Now Coalition, a group which called upon the City of Seattle to divest $180 million from the police budget and invest $50 million of that into the local black community. While the Central District is historically black, much of the neighborhood's black community has been pushed out through a long process of redlining,  racial covenants, gentrification and a rising cost of living in the city.

Late that night, at 2:20 a.m., two people were shot in Cal Anderson Park within the boundaries of the Capitol Hill Occupied Protest zone. A 19-year-old man died and a second man was in critical condition in the Intensive Care Unit with life-threatening injuries. Seattle police attempted to respond but were, according to the police blotter, "met by a violent crowd that prevented officers safe access to the victims." A later investigation by KUOW showed that miscommunication between Seattle police and Seattle Fire delayed city response to the victim. The victims were taken by a CHOP medic to Harborview Medical Center. As of June 21, the suspect remains at large and Seattle police have not released any description of the suspect.

July 4 freeway protest 
On the early morning of July 4, a car drove onto a closed section of Interstate 5, where several people were protesting, and struck two protesters. 23-year-old Summer Taylor from Seattle was killed, while 32-year-old Diaz Love of Portland, Oregon, who was live-streaming the protest on Facebook, remained for a time in critical condition at Harborview Medical Center; by July 13, Diaz Love self-reported being "in stable, satisfactory condition". Troopers from the Washington State Patrol (WSP) said that the driver drove the wrong way on the Stewart Street off-ramp in order to enter the closed section of I-5. A graphic video posted on social media showed the driver, a black man later identified as Dawit Kelete of Seattle, speeding into the crowd around 1:40a.m. in a white Jaguar. After the driver fled the scene, a protester chased him by car for about a mile where they both waited for the arrival of police. Kelete was arrested on two counts of vehicular assault. The WSP announced it would no longer allow protesters to enter I-5, which had been closed off late at night in downtown Seattle (between I-90 and Washington State Route-520) for 19 nights prior to the collision. Kelete pled not guilty.

Mid-July and August events 

After several weeks of calm with low-key protests, demonstrators returned to downtown Seattle on July 19. Police reported that peaceful demonstrators began to gather in the morning at Westlake Park but three hours later they were joined by a second group that was organized and more intent on property destruction. Several buildings were vandalized and police officers were injured, before the protesters dispersed after marching to Cal Anderson Park.

The Capitol Hill neighborhood experienced vandalism, fires, and the looting of several businesses when a group of 150 people returned to the area at late at night on July 22. One of the businesses targeted was owned by a relative of the officer who fatally shot Seattle resident Charleena Lyles, a pregnant black woman, at home in 2017.

On July 25, several thousand protesters gathered in the Capitol Hill neighborhood of Seattle for demonstrations in solidarity with Portland, Oregon. Tensions escalated in the neighboring city in early July after the Trump administration deployed federal forces against the wishes of local officials, stirring controversy and regenerating the protests. The Department of Homeland Security deployed an undisclosed number of federal agents to Seattle on July 23, without notifying local officials, adding to anxieties for the city's residents.

A July 25 march by the Youth Liberation Front gathered peacefully for several hours in the early afternoon, but was later designated a riot by the SPD after the protest devolved into property destruction towards several businesses and fires were started in five construction trailers near a future juvenile detention center. Many marchers reportedly participated out of an understanding that the two central issues of the protest, police brutality and federal overreach, were deeply connected.

Among the businesses vandalized was the Starbucks at 12th and Columbia Street, which had all windows shattered, merchandise stolen, and profanity spray painted throughout the building. The personal vehicles of several employees at the youth jail were vandalized with broken windows, graffiti and slashed tires. KIRO reported that 47 people were arrested and 21 police officers were injured.

On July 26, around 5 p.m. protesters returned to Capitol Hill and gathered at Seattle Central College with “Black Lives Matter” and “defund police” signs. About an hour and a half later protesters marched toward the East Precinct and set up a line on East Pine Street near 12th Avenue using signs, recycling and garbage bins. No arrests, clashes, or property damage was reported.

On August 9, hundreds of pro-police and "Back the Blue" supporters gathered at Seattle City Hall to protest and to call on City Council to not defund the SPD. A group of counter-protesters gathered across the street from City Hall to support defunding the police. Police kept the two groups separate. Later that evening, a group of around 100 people marched along Broadway from Cal Anderson Park. Vandals within the group damaged 8 businesses in Seattle's First Hill neighborhood with much of the damage occurring along Madison Street over to Broadway. Police arrested 6 individuals.

Office of Police Accountability complaints from June 1 
On June 1, Seattle's independent Office of Police Accountability announced that it received some 12,000 individual complaints about police behavior during the first few days of George Floyd protests in the city. The following is a list of ten specific incidents that received the highest number of complaints.

 "Pepper spraying a young girl (Saturday)"
 "Punching a person on the ground who was being arrested (Friday)"
 "Placing a knee on the neck area of two people who had been arrested (Saturday)"
 "Covering up badge numbers"
 "Failing to record law enforcement activity on body-worn video"
 "Pepper spraying peaceful protestors (Saturday)"
 "The use of flashbangs, including causing a significant thumb injury (Saturday)"
 "Failing to secure rifles in the rear of a patrol vehicle (Saturday)"
 "Punching a person on the ground who was being arrested (Sunday)"
 "Officers breaking down windows of a Target store"

Government response 
Washington State Governor Jay Inslee ordered the activation of the Washington National Guard on May 30 in response to the riot.

As a consequence of the May 30 events, all Seattle-bound service by Washington State Ferries, Kitsap Fast Ferries and the Seattle Water Taxi was suspended, with Colman Dock loading westbound traffic to Bainbridge Island and Bremerton only; many downtown streets were closed and bus service was halted; the Westlake and Pioneer Square light rail stations were also closed by Sound Transit. The Washington State Department of Transportation rerouted Interstate 5 freeway traffic away from Downtown Seattle in a 20-mile detour across the Evergreen Point Floating Bridge and Interstate 90 floating bridges, and through the Eastside.President Donald Trump criticized the response of Governor Inslee and Seattle Mayor Jenny Durkan, claiming that they have not been effective in dealing with protesters, especially regarding the Capitol Hill Occupied Protest and the Seattle police's abandonment of the East Precinct. Trump threatened to retake the city if local leaders did not reassert their authority.

Seattle Mayor Jenny Durkan issued an executive order, declaring an end to the zone and authorized police to clear the area. On July 1, the police cleared the protest zone and retook the East Precinct soon-after.

In order to find violent and destructive agitators the FBI monitored the protests and provided intelligence to the Seattle Police Department. The FBI monitored both alleged threats within and against the protests, and they worked with Seattle police when the Capitol Hill Organized Protest zone was cleared.

Procedural changes 
Following a large and peaceful demonstration on June 3, the City of Seattle announced several changes to its policing protocols, including restrictions on badge coverings for officers.

The Seattle City council voted unanimously on June 15 to demilitarize the police department by banning the purchase and use of crowd control weapons including tear gas, pepper spray, flashbang grenades and rubber bullets. The city council also voted to prohibit the use of "choke holds" by Seattle Police. On July 24, in response to a request the U.S. Department of Justice, U.S. District Judge James Robart issued a temporary restraining order, blocking the law from taking effect.

City Attorney Pete Holmes announced that the city would withdraw its request to lift a federal consent decree that had been imposed following a U.S. Department of Justice investigation in 2012. The city government also announced a 30-day ban on the use of tear gas by police on protesters in response to outcry from Capitol Hill residents who had been affected by its use. The ban did not apply to SWAT and other special officers.

The Seattle Public Schools voted on June 24 to terminate contracts with the local police departments.

Arrests 

At least 55 people were arrested in Seattle during the May 30 riots.

A man was arrested near the East Precinct in Capitol Hill on June 7, after he drove into a protest and shot a protester.

On June 11, federal authorities in full SWAT gear arrested Margaret Channon, a 25-year-old Tacoma woman, for allegedly setting fires in five police vehicles during the May 30 riot in Seattle. Channon was charged with five counts of arson in U.S. District Court in Seattle.

On the morning of July 1, there were 44 people arrested in Seattle for refusing to disperse as Seattle police retook the East Precinct and cleared the Capitol Hill Organized Protest zone. That night, 25 more people were arrested near Broadway and East Pine. The following night, on July 2, three people were arrested outside the West Precinct in the Denny Triangle and then later that night seven more were arrested near Broadway and East Pine Street.

A man was arrested on July 4 and charged with two counts of vehicular assault after driving into a crowd of protesters on I-5 in Seattle, killing one protester and critically injuring another.

On July 25, after declaring a riot, police made more than two dozen arrests for "assault on officers, obstruction and failure to disperse" during a protest in the Capitol Hill neighborhood near the former CHOP zone.

Seattle police exodus
In the months following the protests, at least 118 police officers including Chief Carmen Best left the Seattle Police Department, mostly due to low morale and budget cuts, seeking jobs with neighboring police departments. Retiring from police work, Best began working as a law enforcement analyst at local news station King 5. By October, the Seattle Police Officer Guild warned that some 911 calls may go unanswered and that response times will be longer due to lack of personnel.

See also 

 1999 Seattle WTO protests
 Capitol Hill Occupied Protest
 Killing of Manuel Ellis
 Occupy Seattle
 Seattle General Strike

Notes

References

External links
 Video footage and graphic visualizations of the Capitol Hill conflict, at the Western barricade, New York Times, June 26, 2020

2020 in Seattle
George Floyd protests in Seattle
Seattle
May 2020 events in the United States
June 2020 events in the United States
Protests in Seattle
Riots and civil disorder in Washington (state)